The Laramie Boomerang, formerly the Laramie Daily Boomerang, is a newspaper in Laramie, Wyoming, USA.

History
The newspaper was established in March 1881 by American humorist Edgar Wilson ("Bill") Nye, who named the paper after his mule, "Boomerang", named so, Nye had said, because he could trust the mule to return him home no matter how inebriated and disoriented Nye might've become. The Boomerang was founded while Nye was the postmaster of the city, then in the Wyoming Territory. It launched him to national fame, gaining the newspaper subscribers in every state and many foreign countries. Nye contributed several humorous articles to the Boomerang, and served as the paper's editor until 1884.  

At the time of its inception, the paper's masthead read simply Boomerang or The Daily Boomerang and was published every day except Sundays and holidays, with the Saturday edition being titled Saturday Boomerang briefly in 1891–2.  Related titles were also issued: The Weekly Boomerang (1895-1904) and The Semi-Weekly Boomerang (from 1894-1912).  In 1901, the paper became Laramie Boomerang, and was published daily except Sundays, or, during some periods, except Mondays instead.

In 1923, the Boomerang merged with Laramie's other newspaper, The Laramie Republican, retaining the issue numbering of the older paper, the Republican.  The combined press published as The Laramie Republican and the Laramie Boomerang (as a daily except Sunday until 1927) then as The Laramie Republican-Boomerang (as a daily, except for Saturdays, until 1937) and then as The Laramie Republican and Boomerang (also as a daily, except for Saturdays).  

The Boomerang was acquired in 1938 by Tracy McCraken, who had previously been editor of the paper. He had also served as secretary, in 1923, to Wyoming's Democratic Governor William Bradford Ross, and, in 1924, to U.S. Senator John B. Kendrick. Eventually, the Boomerang owner established a "close friendship" with Wyoming's Governor Leslie Andrew Miller and Senator Joseph Christopher O'Mahoney, forming the state's renown "political steam roller" labeled the "M-O-M."

In 1957, another local paper, The Laramie Daily Bulletin, which had been published Tuesdays through Saturdays since 1931, merged with the Republican and Boomerang presses, and the combined paper became The Laramie Daily Boomerang, published daily except on Mondays. In 2004, the word Daily was dropped from the masthead. 

In 2015, the McCracken newspapers were bought by the Adams Publishing Group.

References

External links
Laramie Boomerang Online

Publications established in 1881
Newspapers published in Wyoming
Albany County, Wyoming
Laramie, Wyoming
1881 establishments in Wyoming Territory